Kenley is a district of London.

Kenley may also refer to:

 Kenley, a district in the London Borough of Croydon
 Kenley (ward)
 RAF Kenley, an aerodrome in Kenley that was an RFC and RAF base
 Kenley railway station
 Kenley, Shropshire, a village in England
 Kenley, Victoria, Australia

People
 John Kenley (1906-2009), an American theatrical producer
 Joan Kenley, an American voice actor
 Kenley Jansen (born 1987), baseball pitcher